Montongo is an unincorporated community in Drew County, Arkansas, United States.

References

Unincorporated communities in Drew County, Arkansas
Unincorporated communities in Arkansas